The men's high jump event at the 1971 European Athletics Indoor Championships was held on 13 March in Sofia.

Results

References

High jump at the European Athletics Indoor Championships
High